Sharingain Longkümer is an Indian politician. He is the Speaker of Nagaland Legislative Assembly since February 2020. He was elected to the Nagaland Legislative Assembly from Aonglenden in the by-election in 2019 as a member of the Nationalist Democratic Progressive Party.

Personal life
Longkümer was born to I.Nungshizenba. He graduated with a Bachelor of Arts from Hindu College, Delhi in 2004 and later an LLB from Delhi University in 2010.

References

1980s births
Living people
Nationalist Democratic Progressive Party politicians
People from Mokokchung district
Year of birth missing (living people)
Nagaland MLAs 2018–2023
Deputy Speakers of the Nagaland Legislative Assembly
Delhi University alumni